Krčevina pri Vurbergu (in older sources also Krčovina) is a settlement in the Municipality of Ptuj in northeastern Slovenia. It lies on the left bank of the Drava River and the hills beyond. The area is part of the traditional region of Styria. It is now included with the rest of the municipality in the Drava Statistical Region.

References

External links

Krčevina pri Vurbergu at Geopedia

Populated places in the City Municipality of Ptuj